The 1995 Giro d'Italia was the 78th edition of the Giro d'Italia, one of cycling's Grand Tours. The Giro began in Perugia, with a mountainous stage on 13 May, and Stage 11 occurred on 24 May with a stage to Il Ciocco. The race finished in Milan on 4 June.

Stage 1
13 May 1995 — Perugia to Terni,

Stage 2
14 May 1995 — Foligno to Assisi,  (ITT)

Stage 3
15 May 1995 — Spoleto to Marotta,

Stage 4
16 May 1995 — Mondolfo to Loreto,

Stage 5
17 May 1995 — Porto Recanati to Tortoreto,

Stage 6
18 May 1995 — Trani to Taranto,

Stage 7

Stage 8
20 May 1995 — Acquappesa to Massiccio del Sirino,

Stage 9
21 May 1995 — Terme La Calda to Salerno,

Stage 10
22 May 1995 — Telese Terme to Maddaloni,  (ITT)

Rest day
23 May 1995

Stage 11
24 May 1995 — Pietrasanta to Il Ciocco,

References

1995 Giro d'Italia
Giro d'Italia stages